The 1920 USSR Chess Championship was the first edition of USSR Chess Championship. Held from 4 to 24 October in Moscow. The tournament was won by the future world chess champion Alexander Alekhine.

Table and results

References 

USSR Chess Championships
Championship
Chess
1920 in chess
Chess